Karlie Anne Samuelson (born May 10, 1995) is an American professional basketball player for the Los Angeles Sparks of the Women's National Basketball Association (WNBA) and for Townsville Fire of the Australian Women's National Basketball League. In college, Samuelson played for Stanford University. Her sisters are Bonnie and Katie Lou Samuelson.

Career

High School/College
An Orange County native, Samuelson is the second of three daughters of two former athletes, her father having played basketball in both Cal State Fullerton and England, where he met her mother, a former netball player who reached the England national team. During her high school years, Samuelson played at Huntington Beach's Edison and Mater Dei High School, in Santa Ana before heading off to play in college at Stanford University alongside older sister Bonnie. Samuelson played from 2013 to 2017, while also graduating in human biology. Samuelson, who excelled as a three-point shooter, qualified twice for the NCAA final Four, in her freshman year of 2013, and later as a senior in 2017, where she had been a  Regional All-Tournament Team before losing the semifinal with a sprained ankle.

Professional career

She went undrafted in the 2017 WNBA draft, and joined the Los Angeles Sparks for the 2017 season and played 3 pre-season games, but a fractured left foot suffered during training camp made the team waive her. Samuelson then joined Pallacanestro Vigarano in Italy's Serie A1 for her first professional season. Samuelson left in January, having played 13 games for Vigarano, alleging personal reasons. Afterwards, she became an assistant coach for the Vanguard Lions, while pursuing a master's degree in Coaching and Athletic Administration from Concordia University Irvine, and also re-signed with the Los Angeles Sparks for the 2018 WNBA season where she made the final roster. Samuelson made her WNBA debut on the 20th of May against the Minnesota Lynx scoring 3 points in 13 minutes of playing time, and ultimately appeared in 20 games of the 2018 season and 2 playoff games, averaging 4.2 minutes per game. While Samuelson left after four games due to the return of starter Jantel Lavender, the Sparks eventually brought her back for the rest of the season in June. Following the Sparks' elimination in the playoffs, Samuelson signed to play in BC Castors Braine of Belgium during the offseason. In Belgium, she averaged 16 points per game in the national league, and 9.7 in the Euroleague. After being waived during the Sparks training camp, Samuelson joined them late in the 2019 WNBA season, following her performance in the EuroBasket Women 2019. In August 2019, she joined the Dallas Wings. Samuelson also signed to play in Spain for Perfumerías Avenida. In 2020, Samuelson was renewed by the Wings, which also signed younger  sister Katie Lou Samuelson, but wound up waived before the season begun. Katie and Karlie still wound up playing together for Avenida by the end of the year. Karlie signed again with the Sparks in 2021.  After being released in August, she rejoined Katie in the Seattle Storm. In May 2022, the Phoenix Mercury signed Samuelson to a hardship contract.  The following month, she signed with Australian team Townsville Fire.

Samuelson also appeared as herself in an episode of kids show Ryan's Mystery Playdate.

International career
Like her sister Bonnie, Samuelson chose to play internationally for the Great Britain women's national basketball team, using her mother's nationality. She debuted for the team in February 2018, playing two games in the EuroBasket Women 2019 qualification. In November, Samuelson helped the British team win the final two games, granting them a spot in EuroBasket Women 2019. During the European tournament, Samuelson averaged 11.1 points, 4.4 assists and 2.9 rebounds as the British team finished in fourth place. She also played the Olympic Qualifying Tournament, missing the Olympic qualifying spot while averaging 10.3 points, 4.3 assists and 2 rebounds.

Statistics

College

Source

WNBA

Regular season

|-
| style="text-align:left;"| 2018
| style="text-align:left;"| Los Angeles
| 20 || 0 || 4.2 || .389 || .313 || .000 || 0.5 || 0.3 || 0.1 || 0.3 || 0.2 || 1.0
|-
| style="text-align:left;"| 2019
| style="text-align:left;"| Los Angeles
| 3 || 0 || 12.0 || .143 || .167 || .000 || 0.7 || 1.0 || 0.0 || 0.0 || 0.0 || 1.0
|-
| style="text-align:left;"| 2019
| style="text-align:left;"| Dallas
| 4 || 0 || 12.0 || .286 || .333 || .000 || 0.5 || 0.5 || 0.8 || 0.3 || 0.0 || 1.5
|-
| style="text-align:left;"| 2021
| style="text-align:left;"| Los Angeles
| 11 || 3 || 15.8 || .382 || .478 || .714 || 2.3 || 0.8 || 0.6 || 0.0 || 0.5 || 3.8
|-
| style="text-align:left;"| 2021
| style="text-align:left;"| Seattle
| 3 || 0 || 10.7 || .300 || .125 || 1.000 || 0.3 || 0.7 || 0.0 || 0.0 || 1.0 || 3.0
|-
| style="text-align:left;"| 2022
| style="text-align:left;"| Phoenix
| 1 || 0 || 10.0 || .333 || .333 || .000 || 3.0 || 1.0 || 0.0 || 0.0 || 1.0 || 3.0
|-
| style="text-align:left;"| Career
| style="text-align:left;"| 4 years, 4 teams
| 42 || 3 || 9.1 || .342 || .339 || .778 || 1.0 || 0.5 || 0.3 || 0.1 || 0.3 || 2.0

Playoffs

|-
| style="text-align:left;"| 2018
| style="text-align:left;"| Los Angeles
| 1 || 0 || 3.0 || .000 || .000 || .000 || 1.0 || 0.0 || 0.0 || 0.0 || 0.0 || 0.0
|-
| style="text-align:left;"| Career
| style="text-align:left;"| 1 year, 1 team
| 1 || 0 || 3.0 || .000 || .000 || .000 || 1.0 || 0.0 || 0.0 || 0.0 || 0.0 || 0.0

Notes

External links
WNBA Player Profile

1995 births
Living people
British women's basketball players
American women's basketball players
American expatriate basketball people in Belgium
American expatriate basketball people in Italy
American people of English descent
Basketball players from California
Dallas Wings players
Los Angeles Sparks players
Sportspeople from Fullerton, California
Stanford Cardinal women's basketball players
Shooting guards